The 57th edition of the Vuelta a España (Tour of Spain), a long-distance bicycle stage race and one of the three grand tours, was held from 7 September to 29 September 2002.

Joseba Beloki, the second-place finisher of the 2002 Tour de France was part of the winning ONCE–Eroski team that won the opening team time trial of the race.  Beloki held the lead until the fifth stage when he lost it to a teammate but on the sixth stage which was won by Roberto Heras. Beloki lost considerable time to other general classification contenders Óscar Sevilla, Aitor González and Heras. Sevilla took the leader's jersey which he had worn for much of the previous edition of the Vuelta. After the first individual time trial, his teammate Aitor González was within one second of the jersey. On stage 15, González increased the pace of the group and put Sevilla in difficulty. Heras profited from this and attacked to take the stage win and the lead. Heras kept the lead until the final day when there was an individual time trial. Heras started the day with a lead of one minute and eight seconds over González but he lost this in the first 25 km of the time trial. González took the lead and won the Vuelta, Heras came second and Beloki recovered to eventually finish third overall. The Vuelta was also marked by three stage wins of Italian sprinter Mario Cipollini who retired from the race after his third stage win to prepare for the World Championships.

During stage 15 riders climbed the Alto de l'Angliru in rain. Team cars stalled on the steepest part, some unable to restart because their tires slipped on messages painted by fans. Riders were caught behind them and others had to ride with flat tires because mechanics could not reach them. David Millar crashed three times and protested by handing in his race number a metre from the line. The judges ruled he had not finished the stage and he left the race. He regretted his temper – he had been ninth – and apologised to his team.

Route

Jersey Progress

General classification (final)

References

External links
La Vuelta (Official site in Spanish, English, and French)

 
2002
2002 in road cycling
2002 in Spanish sport